Events from the year 1892 in Japan. It corresponds to Meiji 25 (明治25年) in the Japanese calendar.

Incumbents
Emperor: Emperor Meiji
Prime Minister:
Matsukata Masayoshi: (until 8 August)
Itō Hirobumi: (from 8 August)

Governors
Aichi Prefecture: Takatoshi Iwamura then Senda Sadaaki then Senda Sadaaki then Yasujo then Tokito Konkyo
Akita Prefecture: Yasuhiko Hirayama
Aomori Prefecture: Masa Sawa
Ehime Prefecture: Katsumata Minoru
Fukui Prefecture: Nobuaki Makino then Kunizo Arakawa
Fukuoka Prefecture: Yasujo then Tameharu Yamada
Fukushima Prefecture: Kiyoshi Watanabe then Yoshio Kusaka
Gifu Prefecture: Toshi Kozaki
Gunma Prefecture: Motootoko Nakamura
Hiroshima Prefecture: Baron Takatoshi Iwamura then Senda Sadaaki
Ibaraki Prefecture: Shoichiro Ishii then Nobuaki Makino
Iwate Prefecture: Ichizo Hattori
Kagawa Prefecture: Masao Tanimori
Kochi Prefecture: Kanji Maruoka then Ishida Eikichi
Kumamoto Prefecture: Matsudaira Masanao
Kyoto Prefecture: Baron Kokudo Kitagaki then Baron Akira Senda
Mie Prefecture: Shangyi Narukawa
Miyagi Prefecture: Mamoru Funakoshi
Miyazaki Prefecture: Takayoshi Kyoganu
Nagano Prefecture: Asada Tokunori
Niigata Prefecture: Baron Seung Zhi Kuwata
Oita Prefecture: Baron Shirane Senitsu
Okinawa Prefecture: Kanji Maruoka then Shigeru Narahara
Osaka Prefecture: Nobumichi Yamada
Saga Prefecture: Sukeo Kabayama then Takaya Nagamine
Saitama Prefecture: Kanichi Kubota then Tsunao Hayashi
Shimane Prefecture: Goro Shinozaki
Tochigi Prefecture: Orita Hirauchi
Tokyo: Tomita Tetsunosuke
Toyama Prefecture: Moriyama Shigeru then  Tokuhisa Tsunenori
Yamagata Prefecture: Hasebe Ren

Events
February 15 - General election
May 5 – A first issue of Chugoku Shinbun Newspaper published in Hiroshima Prefecture.

Births
January 25 - Takeo Takagi, admiral (d. 1944)
February 1 - Kan Shimozawa, novelist (d. 1968)
February 5 - Shunji Isaki, admiral (d. 1943)
March 1 - Akutagawa Ryūnosuke, writer (d. 1927)
March 30 - Sanzo Nosaka, one of the founders of the Japanese Communist Party (d. 1993)
April 9 - Haruo Satō, novelist and poet (d. 1964)
June 27 - Yumio Nasu, major general (d. 1942)
August 11 - Eiji Yoshikawa, writer and novelist (d. 1962)
August 17 - Tamon Yamaguchi, admiral (d. 1942)
September 9 - Tsuru Aoki, actress (d. 1961)
October 3 - Sentarō Ōmori, admiral  (d. 1974)
October 16 - Kiyonao Ichiki, military officer (died 1942)
December 15 - Akira Mutō, general (d. 1948)

Deaths
January 23 – Ueki Emori, revolutionary (b. 1857)
June 9 – Yoshitoshi, artist (b. 1839)

References

 
1890s in Japan
Years of the 19th century in Japan